William Edward Seymour Waldegrave, 10th Earl Waldegrave (2 October 1882 – 30 January 1933) was the son of William Waldegrave, 9th Earl Waldegrave and Lady Mary Dorothea Palmer. He died unmarried at age 50 and was succeeded by his uncle, Henry Waldegrave.

References

1882 births
1933 deaths
People from Mendip District
People from Somerset
Earls Waldegrave